Niko Hovinen (born 16 March 1988) is a Finnish professional ice hockey goaltender. He is currently playing with Vaasan Sport of the Liiga.

Playing career

Jokerit
Niko Hovinen's SM-liiga career started during the 2005–06 season when Hovinen dressed for a single regular-season Jokerit game as backup to Joonas Hallikainen, after Tim Thomas abruptly left the team only a day before the start of the 2005–06 regular season. Hovinen returned to the junior team for the rest of the season. He made his first SM-liiga start on 23 November 2006, against SaiPa, again called up when three Jokerit goaltenders were injured.

During the 2007–08 season, Hovinen served as backup to Jussi Markkanen. Hovinen was relegated to no. 3 goaltender when Jokerit acquired Joni Puurula from SaiPa just before the end of regular season. Hovinen dressed up to serve as backup for Joni Puurula in several games during the 2007–08 playoffs as Jussi Markkanen got himself injured during the first game of playoffs.

Pelicans
During the off-season of 2007–08 SM-liiga season, Niko Hovinen was contracted to Pelicans. For the first time, Niko Hovinen will play outside of Jokerit-organization in 2008–09 season.

A tall goaltender at 196 cm, Hovinen covers the net very well and is considered a highly promising goaltender prospect.

Hovinen was ranked #10 on the International Scouting Service's list of goaltender prospects for the 2006 NHL Entry Draft. He was drafted in the fifth round, 132nd overall, by the Minnesota Wild.

North America
Hovinen signed a two-year entry level contract with the National Hockey League's Philadelphia Flyers on 17 May 2011. He remained with the Pelicans through the 2011–12 season.

On 25 January 2013 the Edmonton Oilers claimed Hovinen off unconditional waivers. He was assigned to AHL affiliate, the Oklahoma City Barons, where he remained to end the 2013–14 season.

Back to Europe 
On 2 July 2013, Hovinen's NHL rights were retained by the Oilers after he was tendered a qualifying offer. He opted to return to Europe signing a contract with Metallurg Novokuznetsk of the Kontinental Hockey League (KHL), before moving on to fellow KHL team Admiral Vladivostok.

He split the 2014–15 season between EC Salzburg of Austria and Swedish teams Luleå HF and Malmö Redhawks. In the 2015–16 campaign, Hovinen was back in his native Finland for a second stint with the Pelicans. On 13 June 2016, he put pen to paper on a deal with Medvescak Zagreb of the Kontinental Hockey League and parted ways with the club in November 2016. Later that month, he was picked up by KalPa of the Finnish top-flight Liiga. Following a stint at fellow Liiga outfit KooKoo, he signed with Lausanne HC of the Swiss NLA on February 7, 2017.

A free agent from his 2018–19 season stint in the Deutsche Eishockey Liga with the Iserlohn Roosters, Hovinen familiarly returned to the Ligga, agreeing to a one-year contract with Vaasan Sport on 7 October 2019.

Career statistics

Regular season and playoffs

References

External links

 Jatkoaika.com player profile (in Finnish)

1988 births
Living people
Finnish ice hockey goaltenders
Admiral Vladivostok players
Iserlohn Roosters players
Jokerit players
KalPa players
KooKoo players
Lahti Pelicans players
Lausanne HC players
Luleå HF players
Malmö Redhawks players
KHL Medveščak Zagreb players
Metallurg Novokuznetsk players
Minnesota Wild draft picks
Oklahoma City Barons players
Oulun Kärpät players
Ice hockey people from Helsinki
EC Red Bull Salzburg players
Trenton Titans players
Vaasan Sport players